The Leigh River (or Waywatcurtan in the Wathaurong Aboriginal language) is a perennial river of the Corangamite catchment, located in the Central Highlands region of the Australian state of Victoria.

Location and features
The Leigh River is a major tributary and catchment of the Barwon River. Fed by the Yarrowee River that rises near Ballarat, the Yarrowee reaches its confluence to form the Leigh in the vicinity of Cambrian Hill and Golden Plains Shire. The river descends  over its  course.

Communities and bridge crossings along the river

There are several crossings over the Leigh River, including road, rail and pedestrian. Some additional roads allow passage through shallow sections of the river when the water levels are low.

Etymology
The Wathaurong Aboriginal people named the river Waywatcurtan.

It is believed that the name Leigh River was given by the surveyor J.H. Wedge who arrived in 1835, probably naming the river after his Tasmanian farm Leighlands.

See also

References

External links

Corangamite catchment
Rivers of Grampians (region)
Geography of Geelong